Epicoma tristis, the dark epicoma, is a moth of the family Notodontidae first described by Edward Donovan in 1805. It is found in Australia.

The larvae feed on Eucalyptus, Leptospermum and Kunzea species.

References

Thaumetopoeinae